Midnight Wind is the ninth studio album by Charlie Daniels and the sixth as the Charlie Daniels Band, released on October 7, 1977. It was certified Gold by the RIAA on February 10, 1995.

Critical reception

Stephen Thomas Erlewine of AllMusic says, "Midnight Wind is an overlooked title in the Charlie Daniels Band oeuvre, never appearing on CD until Raven released an expanded version called Midnight Wind...Plus in 2009."

Track listing

All tracks are written by The Charlie Daniels Band (Charlie Daniels, Tom Crain, Taz DiGregorio, Fred Edwards, Charles Hayward & Don Murray), unless otherwise noted.

Side A

Side B

Personnel 

The Charlie Daniels Band
 Charlie Daniels - Guitar, Fiddle, Vocals
 Tom Crain - Guitar, Vocals
 Taz DiGregorio - Keyboards, Vocals
 Fred Edwards - Drums, Percussion
 Charlie Hayward: Bass
 Don Murray - Drums, Percussion

Guest Musicians
 Paul Riddle - congas on "Heaven Can Be Anywhere"; roto toms on "Indian Man"
 Leo LaBranche - string arrangement on "Heaven Can Be Anywhere"

Production

Paul Hornsby – Producer
Kurt Kinzel – Engineer
Steve Tillisch – Assistant Engineer
Don Rubin – Executive Producer
George Marino – Mastered By
Joseph E. Sullivan – Production Supervisor

Track information and credits adapted from the album's liner notes.

Chart performance

Album

Singles

Certifications

References 

1977 albums
Charlie Daniels albums
Albums produced by Paul Hornsby
Epic Records albums